These are the elections in 1967 to the United States House of Representatives:

 
1967